The Wooshin Golden Suites Fire was a fire that occurred at an officetel in Marine City, Haeundae, Busan, South Korea on October 1, 2010. The fire started on the fourth floor, caused by a spark from an electrical outlet, and rapidly spread to the top of the building via external combustible cladding; five injuries were reported.

Fire 
 The fire started around 11:34am on the 4th floor.
 A fire engine with a 52-metre ladder was launched, but firefighters could not control the fire because it spread so quickly. 
 Within 20 minutes, the blaze had reached the 38th floor.
 According to the Korea Times, the blaze was extinguished after 2.5 hours, after mobilising dozens of fire engines and a helicopter that dropped water on the building from above. According to Nathan White and Michael Delichatsios, writing in Fire Hazards of Exterior Wall Assemblies Containing Combustible Components, the original 4th-floor fire was put out by 1 pm, with the entire building fire-free by 6.48 pm.
 Some residents were evacuated by helicopter from the building's roof.

Causes and background 
 There was no sprinkler in the 4th-floor room where the fire started.
 The reinforced glass in the windows hindered firefighters.
 The building featured flammable aluminium composite cladding with a polyethylene core, along with glass wool or polystyrene insulation; the fire rapidly spread up the facade, reaching the top of the tower within 20 minutes.

 The fire primarily spread up a vertical U-shaped indentation in the building's exterior, which created a chimney effect, possibly enhanced by wind blowing in from the sea.

Casualties 
 4 residents and 1 fire fighter were injured.

See also 
 2017 Jecheon fire
 Miryang hospital fire
 
 
 2020 Icheon fire
 
 Marco Polo condo fire

References 

2010 fires in Asia
2010 disasters in South Korea
Building and structure fires in South Korea
History of Busan
Residential building fires
Commercial building fires
High-rise fires